Juventus Futebol Clube, commonly known as Juventus, is a Brazilian football club based in Rio de Janeiro, Rio de Janeiro state.

History
The club was founded on August 11, 2006, by Francisco Carlos da Hora, being named after Italian club Juventus Football Club, as it shares the same colors as the club he supports, which is Botafogo de Futebol e Regatas.

Stadium
Juventus Futebol Clube play their home games at Estádio João Francisco dos Santos. The stadium has a maximum capacity of 3,000 people.

References

Association football clubs established in 2006
Football clubs in Rio de Janeiro (state)
2006 establishments in Brazil